Louis Mapou (born 14 November 1958 in Yaté) is a Kanak politician who has served as the President of the Government of New Caledonia since 22 July 2021.

He is a member of the Palika, and was the president of National Union for Independence group in the Congress of New Caledonia from 2014 to 2021. Also he has also been a municipal councillor of Païta from 1995 to 1998 and since 2020.

Mapou studied at university in Nantes and then in Paris in the 1980s. He was director-general of the Rural Development and Land Management Agency from 1998 to 2005. From 2005 to 2014, he was director of Eramet and chairman of the board of Koniambo Nickel.

References 

Living people
1958 births
New Caledonia politicians
Presidents of the Government of New Caledonia
Kanak people
21st-century French politicians